Analyta albicillalis is a moth in the family Crambidae. It was described by Julius Lederer in 1863. It is found in Indonesia (Ambon Island) and Australia, where it has been recorded Queensland.

References

Moths described in 1863
Spilomelinae
Moths of Indonesia
Moths of Australia